The 2017 24H Series powered by Hankook was the third season of the 24H Series with drivers battling for championship points and titles and the tenth season since Creventic, the organiser and promoter of the series, organises multiple races a year. The races were contested with GT3-spec cars, GT4-spec cars, sports cars, touring cars and 24H-Specials, like silhouette cars.

Calendar

Entry List

Results and standings

Race results
Bold indicates overall winner.

See also
24H Series
2017 Touring Car Endurance Series
2017 24H Proto Series
2017 Dubai 24 Hour

Notes

References

External links

24H Series
24H Series
2017